The 1993–94 season of the EHF Cup was won by BM Alzira in a final match against ASKÖ Linz.

First round

Eighth-finals

Quarter-finals

Semi-finals

Final

References
 

EHF Cup seasons
Ehf Cup, 1993 94
Ehf Cup, 1993 94